Conor Stakelum (born 1968) is an Irish hurling selector and former player. He is a current selector with the Tipperary senior team.

Born in Borrisoleigh, County Tipperary, Stakelum was born into a family that had a strong association with hurling. His uncle, Pat Stakelum, was an All-Ireland-winning captain with Tipperary in 1949. Stakelum quickly became involved with the Borris–Ileigh team at underage levels, winning minor and under-21 county championship medals. He quickly progressed onto the senior club team and won a set of All-Ireland, Munster and county senior championship medals during the 1986-87 season.

Stakelum made his debut on the inter-county scene at the age of seventeen when he joined the Tipperary minor team in 1986. After little success in this grade he progressed onto the under-21 team, winning an All-Ireland medal in 1989. Stakelum made his senior debut during the 1987-88 league and collected a National Hurling League medal in his debut season. He was on and off the senior panel over the next few years, but claimed an All-Ireland medal on the field of play in 1991. Stakelum also won three Munster medals as a non-playing substitute. After playing his last game for Tipperary in August 1993, he was recalled to the panel for one final season in 1995. 

His brother, Richard Stakelum, and his first cousins, Bobby and Aidan Ryan, also enjoyed All-Ireland success with Tipperary.

Stakelum was also selected on several Munster inter-provincial teams. He was a member of the panel in 1989 and 1991, however, he failed to win a Railway Cup medal.

In retirement from playing Stakelum became involved in team management and coaching. He took charge as manager of the Borris-Ileigh senior team in 2014, before being added to the Tipperary senior team as a selector in 2016. In his debut season in this role he helped guide Tipperary to All-Ireland and Munster successes.

Honours

Player

Borris–Ileigh
All-Ireland Senior Club Hurling Championship (1): 1987
Munster Senior Club Hurling Championship (1): 1986
Tipperary Senior Hurling Championship (1): 1986
Tipperary Under-21 Hurling Championship (1): 1987
Tipperary Minor B Hurling Championship (1): 1985

Tipperary
All-Ireland Senior Hurling Championship (1): 1991
Munster Senior Hurling Championship (3): 1988 (sub), 1991 (sub), 1993 (sub)
All-Ireland Under-21 Hurling Championship (1): 1989
Munster Under-21 Hurling Championship (1): 1989

Selector

Tipperary
All-Ireland Senior Hurling Championship (1): 2016
Munster Senior Hurling Championship (1): 2016

References

1968 births
Living people
Borris-Ileigh hurlers
Tipperary inter-county hurlers
Munster inter-provincial hurlers
Hurling managers
Hurling selectors
All-Ireland Senior Hurling Championship winners